Zhang Weiwei (born 7 October 1990) is a water polo player of China. 

She was part of the Chinese team at the  2015 World Aquatics Championships, and the 2016 Summer Olympics.

See also
 China at the 2015 World Aquatics Championships

References

External links

http://www.chinadailyasia.com/sports/2015-12/18/content_15360745.html

Chinese female water polo players
Living people
1990 births
Asian Games medalists in water polo
Water polo players at the 2010 Asian Games
Water polo players at the 2016 Summer Olympics
Olympic water polo players of China
Asian Games gold medalists for China
Medalists at the 2010 Asian Games
21st-century Chinese women